In heraldry and vexillology, a Canadian pale is a centre band of a vertical triband flag (a pale in heraldry) that covers half the length of a flag, rather than a third as in most triband designs. This allows more space to display a central image (common charge). The name was suggested by Sir Conrad Swan, Rouge Dragon Pursuivant (a heraldic office in Britain), and first used by Queen Elizabeth II as Queen of Canada proclaiming the new Canadian flag on 28 January 1965.

The classic Canadian pale is a square central panel occupying half of a flag with 1:2 proportions. However, vexillological usage applies it to any central band that is half the width of the flag, even if this renders it non-square. The term Canadian pale is also used for flags which do not originate in Canada. The 3:5 proposed flag of Taiwan and the 7:11 flag of Saint Vincent and the Grenadines are both described as having a Canadian pale.

The Canadian pale is a popular feature of sub-national, civic and personal heraldry from Canada developed after 1965. A few examples can be found in the flag of Yukon, the flag of the city of Edmonton, Alberta, the arms of Athabaska University, and in the arms of numerous individual recipients.

The term is sometimes used in an even looser sense to refer to any flag with a larger central panel, irrespective of whether or not it covers half the flag. By this looser description, the flag of Norfolk Island (stripes in a ratio of 7:9:7) and the flag of Iowa (ratio legally undefined, but usually the central stripe is less than twice that of the outer stripes) are sometimes considered to have a Canadian pale.

By analogy, any flag which has a central horizontal stripe that is half the height of the flag is sometimes said to have a Spanish fess.

Heraldry

In coats of arms, and heraldry in general, a 'Canadian pale' is what might well be referred to in South African heraldry as a 'broad pale' as its width is half that of the shield on which it is shown as opposed to the ordinary pale's third to a quarter. They are most commonly used in Canadian heraldry.

Flag gallery

References

Flags of Canada
Heraldic ordinaries
Flags by design